The Vamos Stakes is a Tasmanian Turf Club Group 3 Thoroughbred horse race held under Weight for age conditions, for fillies and mares aged three years old and upwards, over a distance of 1,400 metres at Launceston Racecourse, Mowbray, Australia in February. The prize money for the event is A$150,000.

History

Grade
2007–2013 - Listed Race
2014 onwards - Group 3

Winners

 2023 - Jaja Chaboogie
 2022 - Take The Sit
 2021 - Still A Star
 2020 - Deroche
 2019 - Twitchy Frank 
 2018 - Life On The Wire 
 2017 - Kiss Me Ketut
 2016 - I Love It
 2015 - Vibrant Rouge
 2014 - Rebel Bride
 2013 - Beautiful Buns
 2012 - Lady Lynette
 2011 - Lady Lynette
 2010 - I'm A Hussy
 2009 - Lady Lynette
 2008 - Blazonry
 2007 - Lekitama

See also
 List of Australian Group races
 Group races

References

Horse races in Australia
Sprint category horse races for fillies and mares